The 1987–88 Charlotte 49ers men's basketball team represented the University of North Carolina at Charlotte in the 1987–88 college basketball season. This was head coach Jeff Mullins's third season at Charlotte. The 49ers competed in the Sun Belt Conference and played their home games at Dale F. Halton Arena. They finished the season 22–9 (11–3 in Sun Belt play) and won the Sun Belt Conference tournament to receive an automatic bid to the 1988 NCAA tournament. The 49ers lost in the opening round to BYU, 98–92 in OT.

Roster

Schedule and results

|-
!colspan=9 style=| Regular season

|-
!colspan=9 style=| Sun Belt tournament

|-
!colspan=9 style=| NCAA tournament

Rankings

References

UNC Charlotte
Charlotte 49ers men's basketball seasons
UNC Charlotte
UNC Charlotte 49ers men's basket
UNC Charlotte 49ers men's basket